Adimakkachavadam is a 1978 Indian Malayalam film, directed by Hariharan and produced by P. Sukumaran. The film stars M. G. Soman, Jayan, Jayabharathi, K. P. A. C. Lalitha and Adoor Bhasi in the lead roles. The film has musical score by G. Devarajan.

Plot
Sita (Jayabharati), an honest and virtuous girl, is married to Vasu (M.G. Soman) who promptly abandons her after cheating her of her gold jewellery. He uses the money to pay off Ponnamma's father and marries her. Sita has to face the recrimination of society alone as she gives birth to Vasu's child. Meanwhile, Ponnamma realizes that women are as exchangeable as cattle for the cattle trader Vasu. She is persuaded by her ex-lover (Jayan) to elope with him. Will Sita take back her repentant husband? Or has she grown disillusioned by this time?

The film explores the exploitation of women by men, whether they are virtuous and obedient like Sita. Or rebellious like Sita's sister Chandrika who elopes with a rich man's son- only to be abandoned by him.

Cast

M. G. Soman as Vasu
Jayan as Ponnamma's lover
Jayabharathi as Sita
Shubha as Ponnamma
KPAC Lalitha as Parvathiyamma
Adoor Bhasi as Velayudan
Sankaradi as Varkey Muthalali
K. P. A. C. Lalitha as Seetha 
Sathaar as Chaathan
Bahadoor as Madhavan
Kuthiravattam Pappu as Kuttappan
Latha as Chandrika
Suchitra as Omana
Vincent as Jose
Kottayam Santha as Jessy James
Oduvil Unnikrishnan as Guest at song
Pala Thankam as Hostel warden
Bhaskara Kurup as Rakshasan

Soundtrack
The music was composed by G. Devarajan and the lyrics were written by Mankombu Gopalakrishnan.

References

External links
 

1978 films
1970s Malayalam-language films
Films directed by Hariharan